Genís García Iscla (born 18 May 1978) is an Andorran footballer. He currently plays for the Andorra national team and FC Santa Coloma.

National team statistics
Updated 28 September 2014

References

External links

1978 births
Living people
Andorran footballers
FC Santa Coloma players
Association football midfielders
Andorra international footballers